Constitution of 1919 may refer to:

Small Constitution of 1919, Poland
Dáil Constitution, Ireland
Constitution of Germany (1919), Weimar Constitution